Arthur Retière (born 1 August 1997) is a French rugby union winger or full-back and he currently plays for Toulouse in the French Top 14.

Honours

Club 
 La Rochelle
European Rugby Champions Cup: 2021–2022

References

External links
 
L'Équipe profile
ESPN Profile
Toulouse profile

1997 births
Living people
Sportspeople from Dijon
French rugby union players
Rugby union wings
Rugby union fullbacks
Racing 92 players
Stade Rochelais players
Stade Toulousain players
Rugby sevens players at the 2014 Summer Youth Olympics
France international rugby union players